The following is a list of FCC-licensed radio stations in the U.S. state of Vermont, which can be sorted by their call signs, frequencies, cities of license, licensees, and programming formats.

List of radio stations

Defunct
In 2011, the license of WNHV was cancelled. It had been on 910 AM, White River Junction, Nassau Broadcasting III, LLC and was an All Sports station.

In 2015, the license of WAOT-LP, 98.3 FM, Derby, was cancelled. It had been licensed to the  Vermont Agency of Transportation.

On May 22, 2019 the license of WIUV, 91.3 FM, Castleton, was cancelled. It had been licensed to the Board of Trustees/Vermont State Colleges, and transitioned to online-only operation following the license's cancellation.

On November 1, 2022, the license for WCAT, 1390 AM, Burlington, was cancelled. It had been airing a simulcast of mainstream-rock-formatted WWMP 103.3 FM Waterbury.

Notes

 
Radio stations
Vermont